Daniel Revuz (born 1936) is a French mathematician who deals with stochastics. He is the son of the mathematician André Revuz. He received his doctorate in 1969 at the Sorbonne under Jacques Neveu (and Paul-André Meyer). He taught at Paris Diderot University at the Laboratory for Probability Theory of the Institut Mathématique de Jussieu.

He is known as the co-author of an influential research monograph with Marc Yor on stochastic processes and stochastic analysis (local martingale).

References

French mathematicians
Probability theorists
University of Paris alumni
1936 births
Living people